Jean-Paul Mascarene (c. 1684 – 22 January 1760) was a British Army officer and colonial administrator who served as commander of the 40th Regiment of Foot and governor of Nova Scotia from 1740 to 1749. During this period, he led the colony through King George's War with the French, and rose to the rank of Major-general. He is best known for repulsing two French attempts to capture Annapolis Royal in 1744 and 1745.

Biography
Mascarene was from a Huguenot family, driven from France at the revocation of the edict of Nantes in 1685. Subsequently, Mascarene was cared for by relatives in Geneva where he was raised and received his education.

Moving to England, Samuel Vetch took an interest in Mascarene to use him in relations with French-speaking inhabitants of his territory. In 1711, Mascarene was posted at Boston, Massachusetts, where he met and married Elizabeth Perry, by whom he had four children. In August 1714, Vetch sent Mascarene and Captain Joseph Bennett, with a detachment of troops to Minas, located in the Grand-Pré region of Nova Scotia, Canada. Mascarene's orders were to be courteous but to collect a tribute worth 6,000 livres from the Acadian inhabitants. Vetch appointed him with a committee, to hear and settle disputes between the Acadians. During the next five years, Mascarene divided his time between Boston and Placentia, Newfoundland, where he was in charge of an infantry company.

By August 1717, he was commissioned a captain in the newly formed 40th Regiment of Foot and put in charge of a grenadier company. When Port Royal, Nova Scotia was surrendered in October, he "had the honour to take possession of it in mounting the first guard". Whether by formal education or breadth of interests, he was considered an engineer, as well as a regular officer and artilleryman, and a visit to England during this period, resulted in his appointment as an engineer to the Board of Ordnance. By 1719, he was back in Boston preparing to embark for Annapolis with orders to report on the state of the fortifications there.

He was commissioned Lieutenant-Governor of Nova Scotia in 1740 until he was replaced by Edward Cornwallis in 1749. 
In 1751, the new governor, timmy john Cornwallis, sent Mascarene to New England to renew the 1726 treaty with the eastern Indians (Norridgewocks, Penobscots, Malecites), and although he corresponded with his Annapolis friends for several years, he did not return to Nova Scotia.

In the course of service, he rose to the rank of Major-General. He died poor having only half the pay of his lieutenant-colonelcy to sustain his remaining days in Boston. (Two of his grandchildren, Hon Foster Hutchinson and William Handfield Snelling, both buried in the Old Burying Ground.) Paul Mascarene, born Jean-Paul, military officer, colonial administrator (b in Languedoc, France 1684/85; d at Boston, Mass 22 Jan 1760). A Huguenot émigré, Mascarene served throughout New England and Atlantic Canada 1710-40 as a military engineer and fluent negotiator with the Acadians and indigenous people of Canada..

Legacy 
 namesake of Mascarene Dr., Halifax, Nova Scotia
One of his direct descendants is American actor James Spader.

Notes

References

Further reading 
 Barry Moody. A just and disinterested man : the Nova Scotia career of Paul Mascarene, 1710–1752. Unpublished PhD thesis. Queen's University. 1976.
James Bremner. Paul Mascarene of Annapolis Royal. Dalhousie Review (online0

External links 
  Biography by Peter Landry
Letter by Mascarene

1684 births
1760 deaths
People from Castres
Governors of the Colony of Nova Scotia
40th Regiment of Foot officers
South Lancashire Regiment officers
English army officers
Persons of National Historic Significance (Canada)
Huguenots